Vadakarai Keezhpadugai is a town and gram panchayat in Tenkasi district in the Indian state of Tamil Nadu. Agriculture fields most important vadakarai people

Climate 
This region experiences a very pleasant climate even during Summer months The average Summer temperature is 31.5°C.      During Monsoon the showers are usually heavy accompanied by cool breeze.

Places of interest 

Adavinainar Dam

Demographics 

 India census, Vadakarai Keelpidagai had a population of 20821, Males constitute 51% of the population and females 49%.

In the religious census of 2011, Vadakarai Keelpidagai had 24.5% Hindus, 75.00% Muslims, 0.5% Christians following other religions.

References

Cities and towns in Tirunelveli district